Timoxenos was a general in Ancient Greece, who served for three or four terms as strategos of the Achaean League between 226 and 215 BC. He was considered a supporter of Aratus of Sicyon.

References 

Ancient Greek generals
3rd-century BC Greek people
Achaean League